The surname Hector is an English, Dutch, French and German surname.

Origin of the surname

The English surname is found in Yorkshire. It may be derived from a mediaeval personal name. In legend, Britain was founded by Brutus, who was a Trojan. In consequence, the name Hector was chosen, as it was the name of a Trojan king's eldest son—Hector. The Classical Greek Hekter, is probably derived from the Greek ekhein, meaning "hold in check". The Dutch, French, and German surnames are also derived from the Greek name. The surname is rarely found as a French surname. In medieval Germany, the personal name was quite popular among the noble class.

People
Benjamin Hector (born 1979), South African cricketer
Bruce Hector (born 1994), American football player
Kate Hector (born 1981), South African hockey player
James Hector (1834–1907), Scottish geologist, naturalist, and surgeon
Jamie Hector (born 1975), American actor of Haitian descent
Jonas Hector (born 1990), German footballer
Louis Hector (1883–1968), American actor
Willie Hector (born 1939), American football player
Kevin Hector (born 1944), English former footballer who played for Bradford Park Avenue and Derby County

References

Dutch-language surnames
English-language surnames
French-language surnames
German-language surnames
Surnames of English origin